Blunder Boys is a 1955 short subject directed by Jules White starring American slapstick comedy team The Three Stooges (Moe Howard, Larry Fine and Shemp Howard). It is the 166th entry in the series released by Columbia Pictures starring the comedians, who released 190 shorts for the studio between 1934 and 1959.

Plot
After serving in the army, the Stooges decide to go to college and major in criminology. Graduating with the lowest possible honors, the boys join the police force and are assigned to search for a bandit called the Eel (Benny Rubin) who is going to rob the Biltless Hotel. They go to the hotel, but fail to catch the criminal or retrieve the money he stole. As a result, they are booted off the force and end up as ditch diggers.

Cast

Credited
 Moe Howard as Halliday
 Larry Fine as Terriday
 Shemp Howard as Saint Patrick's Day/Groundhog Day/New Year's Day/Christmas Day/Independence Day/Labor Day
 Benny Rubin as The Eel
 Angela Stevens as Alma Matter 
 Kenneth MacDonald as F. B. Eye

Uncredited
 Frank Sully as Watts D. Matter
 Al Thompson as Desk clerk
 Barbara Bartay as Beautician
 Johnny Kascier as Room service waiter/Moe and Shemp's stand-in
 Bonnie Henjum as Woman in swimsuit
 Barbara Donaldson as Turkish bath tanner
 Marjorie Jackson as Turkish bath brunette
 June Lebow as Turkish bath blonde

Production notes
Blunder Boys was the last Stooge film featuring Shemp Howard that was not a remake. In addition, it would also be the last film released during his lifetime; Shemp died of a heart attack 19 days later after its release. Filming was completed on January 24–26, 1955.

The premise of Blunder Boys is a parody of the television series Dragnet. The ending was also a parody of the company that ran Dragnet, (Mark VII Limited); Moe stamps the logo, "VII 1/2 The End", on Larry's head in a similar fashion to how it is done in the logo.

Of his 16 appearances with the Stooges, Blunder Boys marks the only time Kenneth MacDonald was not cast as the team's antagonist.

Blunder Boys was the last Stooges film to feature new footage of long-time supporting actor Al Thompson.

See also
List of American films of 1955

References

External links
 
 
Blunder Boys at threestooges.net

1955 films
The Three Stooges films
American black-and-white films
Films directed by Jules White
1955 comedy films
Columbia Pictures short films
1950s English-language films
1950s American films
American comedy short films